George Branham III (born November 21, 1962) is a professional ten-pin bowler and former member of the Professional Bowlers Association (PBA). He began his career in 1984 and retired at the end of the 2003 season. His career is most noted because he was the first African American to win a PBA tour title as well as win the Tournament of Champions. He had been the only African American to win a PBA Tour title until Gary Faulkner Jr. won the PBA World Championship in December, 2015.

Bowling career
Branham started bowling at the young age of six when his father introduced the sport to him. His first real accomplishment as a bowler came when he won the Southern California Junior Bowler of the year tournament in 1983. The following year in 1984 Branham joined the PBA tour where he was runner-up in rookie of the year voting. His first success came on November 22, 1986, at the Brunswick Memorial World open in Chicago, Illinois, where he defeated Mark Roth 195–191 and earned a purse of $33,260. Branham set a PBA record by winning his first eight TV finals matches, which still stands today.

After a four-year stretch of little success, Branham found himself in the final match at the 1991 ABC Masters, where he faced Doug Kent.  The match ended in a 236–236 tie, sending it to a 9th/10th frame roll-off. Branham managed just 28 pins in the roll-off, to Kent's 50 pins, and had to settle for second place.

Branham would redeem himself at the 29th annual Firestone Tournament of Champions in Fairlawn, Ohio. His victory at the Baltimore Open in 1993 qualified him to participate in this annual invitational tournament, considered by PBA insiders to be the most prestigious of all PBA majors because the starting field includes only title winners. Branham's victory over Parker Bohn III with a score of 227–214 earned him a $60,000 first prize.  This helped Branham reach a career high $107,000 in earnings that season. Not only was this the last time the tournament would be sponsored by Firestone, but Branham became the first and only (as of 2021) African American to win the Tournament of Champions.

Following this tournament, Branham only won one more title in 1996 before his retirement at the end of the 2003 season. He finished his career with five titles in the PBA. His total PBA Tour earnings topped out at $747,138, and throughout his career Branham recorded a total of 23 perfect 300 games in PBA events.

PBA Titles

Personal life
Though Branham was born in Detroit, he grew up in Southern California with his two older sisters and one younger brother. After retiring, George began a new career in sales with Pepsi in Indianapolis, where he now lives.

References

1962 births
Living people
African-American sportsmen
American ten-pin bowling players
Sportspeople from California
Sportspeople from Detroit
Sportspeople from Indianapolis
21st-century African-American people
20th-century African-American sportspeople